Odean Skeen (born 28 August 1994) is a Jamaican sprinter.

Career

At the inaugural 2010 Summer Youth Olympics in Singapore, Skeen won the 100 metres in his then-personal best of 10.42 seconds, ahead of Masaki Nashimoto and David Bolarinwa. On 21 April 2017, while competing for Auburn University at the War Eagle Invitational in Auburn, Alabama, Skeen set a new personal best of 9.98, becoming the 15th Jamaican to break the 10-second barrier.

Achievements

References

External links

 
 

1994 births
Living people
People from Saint Catherine Parish
Jamaican male sprinters
Athletes (track and field) at the 2010 Summer Youth Olympics
Youth Olympic gold medalists for Jamaica
Youth Olympic gold medalists in athletics (track and field)
Auburn Tigers men's track and field athletes